Yangibozor may refer to:
Places
 Yangibozor, Bukhara Region, town in Bukhara Region, Uzbekistan.
 Yangibozor, Xorazm Region, town in Xorazm Region, Uzbekistan.
 Yangibozor, Tashkent Region, town in Tashkent Region, Uzbekistan.

See also
 Yangibazar (disambiguation)